I ragazzi della 3ª C was an Italian television series.

Plot
The TV series, set in Italy in the 1980s, tells the story of a class at "Leopardi" high school in Rome, on the way to the final exams. It consists of three seasons for a total of 33 episodes broadcast from 1987 to 1989 on Italy 1, TV station of Fininvest (now Mediaset).

See also
List of Italian television series

External links
 

Italian television series
Italia 1 original programming